Teemu Vuorisalo (born 3 February 1995) is a Finnish ice hockey defenceman. He is currently playing with Karhu HT in the Finnish Suomi-sarja.

Vuorisalo made his Liiga debut playing with Ässät during the 2014–15 Liiga season.

References

External links

1995 births
Living people
Finnish ice hockey defencemen
Ässät players
Sportspeople from Pori